Brigadier Raymond Walter Tovell  & Bar, ED (9 March 1890 – 18 June 1966) was an Australian soldier and politician.

He was born in Brighton to solicitor Charles Edward Tovell and Mary Annie Mitchell. He attended Brighton Grammar School and qualified as an accountant in 1911. During the First World War, he served with the 4th Brigade, attaining the rank of major and being awarded the Distinguished Service Order (DSO). After his return, he was a member of the Tovell and Lucas accountancy firm, but remained in the military, as commanding officer of the 14th Battalion from 1924 to 1930, and the 46th Battalion from 1932 to 1938.

Tovell served on Brighton City Council from 1924 to 1926. On 10 June 1924, he married Madelaine Eliza Dubrelle Guthrie, with whom he had two daughters. He was on the army staff at headquarters from 1938 to 1939, when he returned to active duty as a brigadier and commander of the 10th and 26th brigades, serving at Tobruk, El Alamein and in New Guinea. He was mentioned in despatches thrice (making five times in total), awarded a bar to the DSO in 1942, and appointed a Commander of the Order of the British Empire in 1943. From 1944 to 1945 he was deputy adjutant-general at Land Headquarters, and he was awarded the Efficiency Decoration.

In 1945, Tovell was elected to the Victorian Legislative Assembly as the Liberal member for Brighton, and from 1948 to 1950 he was Minister of Public Instruction. A supporter of Thomas Hollway, he was Minister of Education and Electrical Undertakings during Hollway's seventy-hour ministry in 1952 and was consequently expelled from the Liberal and Country Party. As an Electoral Reform Party candidate, he retained his seat at the 1952 state election, but was defeated at the 1955 election, when standing for the Victorian Liberal Party. Tovell died at Brighton in 1966.

References

1890 births
1966 deaths
People educated at Brighton Grammar School
Australian accountants
Australian brigadiers
Australian military personnel of World War I
Australian Army personnel of World War II
Australian Commanders of the Order of the British Empire
Australian Companions of the Distinguished Service Order
Liberal Party of Australia members of the Parliament of Victoria
Members of the Victorian Legislative Assembly
Military personnel from Melbourne
Victorian Liberal Party members of the Parliament of Victoria
20th-century Australian politicians
People from Brighton, Victoria
Politicians from Melbourne